The Roman Catholic Diocese of Líbano–Honda is a diocese located in northern Tolima Department in Colombia, with sees in the cities of Líbano and Honda in the ecclesiastical province of Ibagué in Colombia.

History
The Diocese of Líbano–Honda was erected from territory within the northern end of the Archdiocese of Ibagué on 8 July 1989.

Ordinaries
José Luis Serna Alzate, I.M.C. (8 July 1989 – 12 July 2002)
Rafael Arcadio Bernal Supelano, C.Ss.R. (10 January 2003 – 28 February 2004)
José Miguel Gómez Rodríguez (22 November 2004 – 23 February 2015), appointed Bishop of Facatativá
José Luis Henao Cadavid (17 October 2015 – )

See also
Roman Catholicism in Colombia

References

Roman Catholic dioceses in Colombia
Roman Catholic Ecclesiastical Province of Ibagué
Christian organizations established in 1989
Roman Catholic dioceses and prelatures established in the 20th century